An ofrenda is the offering placed in a home altar during the annual and traditionally Mexican  celebration.

Ofrenda may also refer to:
 Ofrenda (Danny Rivera album), 1986
 Ofrenda (Lila Downs album), 1994